"The Peaceful" is an epithet applied to:

 Amadeus VIII, Duke of Savoy (1383–1451), also Antipope Felix V
 Aymon, Count of Savoy (1291–1343)
 Conrad I of Burgundy (c. 925–993), King of Burgundy
 Edgar, King of England (943–975)
 Henry the Peaceful, Duke of Brunswick-Lüneburg (1411–1473)
 Henry II, Duke of Brunswick-Lüneburg (before 1296–after 1351)
 Louis I, Landgrave of Hesse (1402–1458)
 Olaf III of Norway (c. 1050–1093), King of Norway

See also
 List of people known as the Gentle
 List of people known as the Mild
 List of people known as the Warlike

Lists of people by epithet